Rumailah (Arabic: الرميلة) is a small village in Saudi Arabia on the eastern side of Al-Ahsa. It has an estimated population of over 12,065 (2006). It is bordered by Omran, Murkaz, Dalwa and Huta. It is 350 km from Riyadh.

There are eight mosques in Rumailah and five Hussainyahs. The major mosque is AlZahrah mosque, built in the 2nd century after the Hijrah. There are many crops grown in Rumailah such as grapes, bananas, lemons, cantaloupes, papayas, watermelons, dates, lettuce, zucchini, radishes, celery, parsley, tomatoes, onions and pomegranates.

External links

 (Arabic)

Populated places in Eastern Province, Saudi Arabia